Tony Stewart (born 1971) is an American auto racing driver. 

Tony Stewart may also refer to:
 A. T. Q. Stewart (1929–2010), Northern Irish author and historian, best known as Tony Stewart
 Tony Stewart (American football) (born 1979), professional football player for the Oakland Raiders
 Tony Stewart (Australian racing driver), Australian racing driver who participated in the 1973 Singapore Grand Prix
 Tony Stewart (politician) (born 1956), Australian politician
 Tony Stewart (Canadian football) (born 1968), former running back in the Canadian Football League
 Tony Stewart (Coronation Street), a fictional character from the long-running soap opera

See also
 Anthony Stewart (disambiguation)
 Tony Steward (disambiguation)
 Stewart (name)